Karel Lidický (17 June 1900 – 21 May 1976) was a Czech sculptor. His work was part of the sculpture event in the art competition at the 1932 Summer Olympics.

References

1900 births
1976 deaths
20th-century Czech sculptors
20th-century male artists
Czech male sculptors
Olympic competitors in art competitions
People from Hlinsko